The Duomo of San Giorgio (i.e. "Cathedral of St George") is a Baroque church located in Modica, Province of Ragusa, Sicily, Italy. It is the Mother Church of the city and it is included in the World Heritage List by UNESCO.

The building is the final result of the eighteenth century reconstruction, which took place following the disastrous earthquakes that struck Modica in 1542, in 1613 and in 1693. The reconstruction started in 1702, and ended in  1738. Further works were made until the affixing of the iron cross on the spire in 1842, which marked the definitive appearance of the church.

According to the art historian Maurizio Fagiolo dell'Arco the Church should be included among "the seven wonders of the baroque world".

References

External links 

Roman Catholic churches in Modica
Modica
Roman Catholic churches completed in 1842
19th-century Roman Catholic church buildings in Italy
Baroque church buildings in Sicily
World Heritage Sites in Italy